Tom Eustace Burridge (30 April 1881 in Pimlico – 16 September 1965 in Chatham, Kent) was a British footballer who won a gold medal at the 1900 Summer Olympics as part of the Upton Park club side. He played centre half.

His name is sometimes spelled Barridge and his initials given as J. E. by some sources, but he is listed as T. E. Burridge, both by the IOC on their website, and by other statistical sources such as RSSSF.

References

External links

Buchanan, Ian  British Olympians. Guinness Publishing (1991) 
T. E. Burridge's profile at Sports Reference.com

1881 births
1965 deaths
English footballers
Olympic gold medallists for Great Britain
English Olympic medallists
Footballers at the 1900 Summer Olympics
Olympic footballers of Great Britain
Upton Park F.C. players
Olympic medalists in football
Medalists at the 1900 Summer Olympics
Association football midfielders
People from Pimlico
Footballers from Greater London